The 1972–73 English Hockey League season took place from September 1972 until May 1973.

The principal event was the Men's Cup (National Clubs Championship) which was won by Hounslow.

The vast majority of the season consisted of regional leagues. The first National League tournament (The National Inter League Championship) would not be introduced until September 1975.

Men's Cup (Benson & Hedges National Clubs Championship)

Quarter-finals

Semi-finals

Final
(Held at Colston's School, Bristol on 6 May)

References

1972–73
field hockey
field hockey
1973 in field hockey
1972 in field hockey